The Panzerfaust 3 (lit. "armor fist" or "tank fist") is a modern semi-disposable recoilless anti-tank weapon, which was developed between 1978 and 1985 and first entered service with the Bundeswehr in 1987 (although they did not officially adopt it until 1992). It was first ordered in 1973 to provide West German infantry with an effective weapon against contemporary Soviet armor, thereby replacing West Germany's aging PzF 44 Light Lanze launchers and the heavy Carl Gustaf 84 mm anti-tank recoilless rifle manufactured in Sweden.

The Panzerfaust 3 is operated by at least 11 countries and has seen combat in Afghanistan and Ukraine.

History

The Panzerfaust 3's name dates back to the Panzerfaust used by the German army in World War II, which consisted of a small, disposable preloaded launch tube firing a high-explosive anti-tank (HEAT) warhead, operated by one soldier.

The introduction of reactive and active armors on combat vehicles of the then Warsaw Pact countries started a development in the technology of the ability of the warheads, the effective range and the optical sights of anti-tank recoilless rifles were therefore improved substantially. Despite these technological improvements, the primary role of the recoilless firing system as the most effective weapon against armored tanks, at a distance up to 600 meters, remained the most important to infantrymen until the late 1990s.

After the formation of the Bundeswehr in 1956, one task of all troop formations was "fighting armored vehicles and tanks". The Bundeswehr at the time was equipped with the aging Panzerfaust 44 and the heavy Carl Gustaf 84 mm recoilless rifle. These infantry weapon systems equipped with an armor-piercing shaped charge warhead would have fought not only tanks but also machine gun nests, anti-tank positions, bunkers or field positions, etc. in open terrain. During the 1970s, new conceptional and tactical considerations were made in order to balance the constantly progressing development in tank technology.

Timetable 

In 1979, Dynamit Nobel AG received a development order. The first troop test began in 1986, and in 1992 the Panzerfaust 3 was officially introduced. The improved PzF 3-T replaced the original model in the late 1990s. This introduced a dual hollow charge "tandem" warhead to defeat explosive reactive armor. This means that the spike projecting from the warhead also contains an explosive charge to set off reactive armor and free the path to the main armor for the secondary warhead. The latest incarnation of the Panzerfaust 3, the PzF 3-IT-600, can be fired from ranges up to 600 meters thanks to an advanced computer-assisted sighting and targeting mechanism.

As of 2005, there were two more models in the development or testing stage, both relying on smaller, and therefore lighter, warheads. These were the Rückstoßfreie Granatwaffe RGW (Recoilless Grenade Weapon) in calibres 60 and 90 millimeters. Both new weapons are expected to help facilitate the transition in German military doctrine from preparation for major tank battles to urban and low-level warfare.

Principle

The Panzerfaust 3 series of launchers is a compact, lightweight, shoulder-fired, unguided antitank weapon series. It consists of a disposable canister with a 110-mm warhead and reusable firing and sighting device. The DM12 and DM12A1 projectile consists of a shaped-charge warhead and is filled with Octol 7030. The tandem DM22 warheads are made of PBX octogene (ca. 95% β-HMX) including the propulsion unit. The penetration performance of the Panzerfaust 3 is due to the shaped charge principle and the quick response of the percussion fuse; the effect on the target does not depend on the impact velocity.

The Panzerfaust 3 is light enough to be carried and fired by one person. However, earlier variants were described as being excessively cumbersome and uncomfortable. Furthermore, the firing mechanism was prone to jamming. It can be fired from enclosed spaces since it does not have a significant backblast. The rear of the tube, filled with plastic granulate, minimizes the blast effect by the so-called recoilless countermass principle.

The booster propellant for the projectile in its tube is ignited by a bolt via a spring mechanism. Once ejected from the launcher, the projectile coasts a safe distance and then the rocket motor is ignited, boosting it to its maximum speed, after which it coasts until impact. The gunner carries at least two rounds, while the assistant grenadier carries another three rounds.

The ergonomic design of the controls, such as handles, launcher, barrel shape and optical sight, is a predefined standard. All controls are easy to handle in all shooting positions (lying, kneeling, or standing). After the weapon is fired, the firing mechanism with the attached optical sight is removed and the barrel thrown away, the firing mechanism is reusable. The effective combat range of the Panzerfaust 3 is from 15 to 300 meters against moving targets and up to 600 meters against static ones. An optical sight with line pattern fixed to the reusable firing mechanism enables it to engage moving or static targets. To ensure night combat ability, a night-vision device or residual light amplifier can be set up in front of the optical sight.

As a safety precaution, the built-in fuse for the warhead is released by a safety mechanism. This arms the warhead after a flight distance of approximately five meters. Once armed, the warhead detonates on impact or when the propellant is exhausted, thus safeguarding against future unexploded ordnance hazards.

Further development
A new sight called Dynarange is currently being procured as part of the German Infantryman of the Future project. Essentially, this is a computer controlled aiming sight with range finder. It is meant to cope with the fact that some soldiers have had difficulties with the regular sight, as its scope is quite complex to the untrained eye. It would increase the weapon's effective range to 600 m (2,000 ft) against moving and stationary targets. Dynarange is already in service with the Royal Netherlands Marine Corps and the Dutch Army.

Variants
Data

 :
 Original system with 110-mm HEAT grenade (nose probe for 700 mm penetration).
 Optical day sight limits range to 300m moving, 400 stationaries.
 :
 Upgrade with 3-T tandem HEAT grenade and original day sight.
 It is effective against targets to 300m moving, 400m stationary.
 Night sight is optional.
 :
 Upgrade adds the IS2000 computer laser day sight with range of out to 600 m for moving targets.
 Advanced tripod mount with a SIRA sensor package uses acoustic detection and IR sensor triggering.
 It uses the Simrad KN250 series II night sight.
 Acquisition-to-firing time is 3–4 seconds
 Panzerfaust 3-IT600:
 Ability upgrade adds more recent 3-IT grenade which penetrates 900 mm armor (equals 750 mm vs armor behind ERA).
 Pzf-3-LR/RS, PzF-N version available.
 Pzf-3-LR semi-active laser homing (SAL-H) system and requires a  laser guidance unit and SAL-H grenade.
 Pzf-N designed to compete for UK NLAW.
 :
 Light-weight launcher weighing less than 10 kg.
 :
 Long-range semi-active laser homing (SAL-H) system and requires  laser guidance unit and SAL-H grenade.
 Range: 800 m; armor penetration: 700 mm.

Specifications

PzF 3
Standard anti-tank version with hollow charge warhead
 Calibre:
 launcher: 
 warhead: 
 Weight:
 fire-ready weapon: 
 warhead: 
 spare rounds: 
 Length: 
 Muzzle velocity: 
 Highest possible speed: 
 Sights: telescope sights (can be reused)
 Maximum effective range:
 Stationary targets: 
 Moving targets: 
 Minimum effective range: 
 Penetration ability:
 Rolled homogeneous armour (RHA): 
 Concrete:

PzF 3-IT
Improved anti-tank version with tandem hollow charge warhead (designed to penetrate reactive armour)
 Calibre:
 launcher: 
 warhead: 
 Weight:
 fire-ready weapon: 
 warhead: 
 spare rounds: 
 Length: 
 Muzzle velocity: 
 Highest possible speed: 
 Sights: telescope sights (can be reused)
 Maximum effective range:
 Stationary targets: 
 Moving targets:  ( with DYNARANGE sight)
 Minimum effective range: 
 Penetration ability:
 RHA:

PzF 3 Bunkerfaust
Designed for use against hardened bunkers, lightly armored vehicles & soft targets
 Calibre:
 launcher: 
 warhead: 
 Weight:
 fire-ready weapon: 
 warhead: 
 spare rounds: 
 Length: 
 Muzzle velocity: 
 Highest possible speed: 
 Sights: telescope sights (can be reused)
 Maximum effective range: 
 Minimum effective range: 
 Manufacturer: Dynamit-Nobel, Germany
 Penetration capacity:
 RHA: 
 Concrete: 
 Sandbags:

Ammunition
 PzF 3:
 HEAT -125, HEAT-90, HESH, MZ-110 (Multipurpose-Frag), Illumination, IR Smoke, Smoke. Penetration: 600m/800+ mm
 3LW-HESH, 3LWD Multipurpose PZF-3 (110mm HEAT-original rd), BASTEG Bunker Busters. Penetration: 300-400m/700+ mm
 PzF 3-IT:
 Pzf-N (Tandem HEAT). Penetration: 600m/900+mm
 Pzf-3-LR (Tandem SAL-H). Penetration: 800m/700+mm
 Other munitions as noted above.

Operators

 
 
 
  – Peshmerga 200 launchers and 2,500 rockets
  2,000 launchers with 17,000 rockets delivered since middle '90s; 7,100 Panzerfaust 3-T (PZF3-T) delivered in 2007
 
 
 : 1,700 Panzerfaust 3 rockets and 181 launchers.
 
 
 : Supplied by Germany and the Netherlands during 2022 Russian invasion of Ukraine.

See also
 PzF 44
 PSRL-1
 Alcotán-100
 Armbrust
 MATADOR (weapon)

References

External links

 

Anti-tank rockets
Cold War anti-tank rockets of Germany
Post–Cold War weapons of Germany
Military equipment introduced in the 1980s